Thaís Ribeiro Picarte (born 22 July 1982) is a Brazilian former international football goalkeeper who last played for Santos. During her career she has played in the Brazilian, Spanish and Italian leagues.

Thaís took part in the 2011 World Cup as a reserve. She was Brazil's first choice goalkeeper during 2007 World Cup qualification.

References

External links

 
 
 Profile at Sporting Huelva 

Brazilian women's footballers
2011 FIFA Women's World Cup players
1982 births
Living people
Primera División (women) players
Levante UD Femenino players
Serie A (women's football) players
S.S. Lazio Women 2015 players
Brazil women's international footballers
Associação Desportiva Centro Olímpico players
Brazilian expatriate women's footballers
Expatriate women's footballers in Spain
Expatriate women's footballers in Italy
Brazilian expatriate sportspeople in Spain
People from Santo André, São Paulo
Women's association football goalkeepers
São José Esporte Clube (women) players
Sporting de Huelva players
Footballers from São Paulo (state)
Pan American Games medalists in football
Footballers at the 2011 Pan American Games
Pan American Games silver medalists for Brazil
Medalists at the 2011 Pan American Games